Lagocheilus is a genus of gastropods in the family Cyclophoridae.

Species

 Lagocheilus acutecingulatus van Benthem Jutting, 1963
 Lagocheilus alticola Laidlaw, 1937
 Lagocheilus aruanus C. R. Boettger, 1922
 Lagocheilus bangueyensis E. A. Smith, 1895
 Lagocheilus barbatus (L. Pfeiffer, 1855)
 Lagocheilus baritensis E. A. Smith, 1893
 Lagocheilus bellulus (E. von Martens, 1865)
 Lagocheilus bellus (E. von Martens, 1872)
 Lagocheilus bifimbriatus Möllendorff, 1890
 Lagocheilus binoyae (Sykes, 1899)
 Lagocheilus borneensis E. A. Smith, 1893
 Lagocheilus brocchus E. von Martens, 1908
 Lagocheilus buginensis P. Sarasin & F. Sarasin, 1899
 Lagocheilus cagayanicus Quadras & Möllendorff, 1895
 Lagocheilus calciphilus van Benthem Jutting, 1963
 Lagocheilus carinulatus Zilch, 1955
 Lagocheilus celebicus P. Sarasin & F. Sarasin, 1899
 Lagocheilus ciliatus (G. B. Sowerby I, 1843)
 Lagocheilus ciliferus (Mousson, 1849)
 Lagocheilus ciliger Gredler, 1887
 Lagocheilus compressum Möllendorff, 1894
 Lagocheilus concavospira Möllendorff, 1902
 Lagocheilus conicus (Martens, 1860)
 Lagocheilus convexus Möllendorff, 1897
 Lagocheilus costulatus Möllendorff, 1900
 † Lagocheilus cretaspira Asato & Hirano, 2019
 Lagocheilus daflaensis Godwin-Austen, 1917
 Lagocheilus depictus (Tapparone Canefri, 1884)
 Lagocheilus dohertyi (Fulton, 1899)
 Lagocheilus drepanophorus van Benthem Jutting, 1958
 Lagocheilus euryomphalus Möllendorff, 1895
 Lagocheilus exiguus E. A. Smith, 1894
 Lagocheilus fischeri Morlet, 1886
 Lagocheilus flaveovariegatus van Benthem Jutting, 1963
 Lagocheilus franzhuberi Thach, 2021
 Lagocheilus galatheae (Mörch, 1872)
 Lagocheilus garelli (Eydoux & Souleyet, 1852)
 Lagocheilus glabratus Möllendorff, 1886
 Lagocheilus grandipilus O. Boettger, 1891
 Lagocheilus grandis Möllendorff, 1890
 Lagocheilus gudei Schepman, 1919
 Lagocheilus guimarasensis (G. B. Sowerby I, 1843)
 Lagocheilus helicoides (G. B. Sowerby I, 1843)
 Lagocheilus humilis Möllendorff, 1897
 Lagocheilus hungerfordianus (Möllendorff, 1881)
 Lagocheilus hypselospirus Möllendorff, 1901
 Lagocheilus inconspicuus P. Sarasin & F. Sarasin, 1899
 Lagocheilus inornatus E. A. Smith, 1893
 Lagocheilus jucundus E. A. Smith, 1893
 Lagocheilus kinabaluensis E. A. Smith, 1895
 Lagocheilus klobukowskii (Morlet, 1885)
 Lagocheilus kobelti Sykes, 1903
 Lagocheilus landesi (Morlet, 1885)
 Lagocheilus laomontanus (L. Pfeiffer, 1863)
 Lagocheilus leporinus W. T. Blanford, 1865
 Lagocheilus liratulus Möllendorff, 1894
 Lagocheilus longipilus Möllendorff, 1884
 Lagocheilus macromphalus Möllendorff, 1897
 Lagocheilus malleatus (W. T. Blanford & H. F. Blanford, 1861)
 Lagocheilus marangensis Aldrich, 1898
 Lagocheilus metcalfei (Issel, 1874)
 Lagocheilus michaui (Crosse & P. Fischer, 1863)
 Lagocheilus mundus van Benthem Jutting, 1959
 Lagocheilus natunensis E. A. Smith, 1894
 Lagocheilus nubeculus van Benthem Jutting, 1963
 Lagocheilus oakesi Godwin-Austen, 1918
 Lagocheilus obianum Möllendorff, 1902
 Lagocheilus obliquistriatus Bullen, 1904
 Lagocheilus occultus Sykes, 1899
 Lagocheilus omphalotropis Möllendorff, 1887
 Lagocheilus pachychilus Möllendorff, 1902
 Lagocheilus pachytropis Möllendorff, 1896
 Lagocheilus papuanus E. A. Smith, 1897
 Lagocheilus parvus (G. B. Sowerby I, 1843)
 Lagocheilus pellicosta (Möllendorff, 1882)
 Lagocheilus phayrei (Theobald, 1870)
 Lagocheilus pilosus Möllendorff, 1884
 Lagocheilus plagiostomaticus van Benthem Jutting, 1958
 Lagocheilus poirieri (Tapparone Canefri, 1883)
 Lagocheilus polynema (Mörch, 1876)
 Lagocheilus polytropis Quadras & Möllendorff, 1895
 Lagocheilus quadrasi Möllendorff, 1887
 Lagocheilus quadricinctus E. A. Smith, 1895
 Lagocheilus quinqueliratus Möllendorff, 1887
 Lagocheilus rabongensis E. A. Smith, 1895
 Lagocheilus reticulatus Möllendorff, 1897
 Lagocheilus roepstorfi (Mörch, 1876)
 Lagocheilus rollei Möllendorff, 1902
 Lagocheilus romblonensis Möllendorff, 1897
 Lagocheilus saetigerus van Benthem Jutting, 1958
 Lagocheilus scalaris Quadras & Möllendorff, 1895
 Lagocheilus scissimargo (Benson, 1856)
 Lagocheilus sexfilaris (Heude, 1882)
 Lagocheilus shiplayi (L. Pfeiffer, 1857)
 Lagocheilus sikhimensis Godwin-Austen, 1917
 Lagocheilus similis E. A. Smith, 1893
 Lagocheilus sirhassenensis E. A. Smith, 1894
 Lagocheilus smithi Kobelt, 1897
 Lagocheilus solidulus Möllendorff, 1894
 Lagocheilus stenomphalus Möllendorff, 1890
 Lagocheilus stephanophorus Möllendorff, 1895
 Lagocheilus striolatus Stoliczka, 1872
 Lagocheilus swettenhami de Morgan, 1885
 Lagocheilus tapparonei Boettger, 1922
 Lagocheilus tenebricosus (A. Adams & Reeve, 1848)
 Lagocheilus tigrinulus Möllendorff, 1891
 Lagocheilus tomotremus (Benson, 1857)
 Lagocheilus townsendi Crosse, 1879
 Lagocheilus trichophorus (Möllendorff, 1881)
 Lagocheilus trochoides Stoliczka, 1872
 Lagocheilus tumidulus Quadras & Möllendorff, 1895
 Lagocheilus umbilicatus (Kobelt, 1886)
 Lagocheilus vescus (Sykes, 1899)
 Lagocheilus warnefordianus G. Nevill, 1878
 Lagocheilus wuellerstorfianus (Zelebor, 1867)

Species brought into synonymy
 †Lagocheilus electrospira Asato & Hirano, 2019: synonym of † Eotrichophorus electrospira (Asato & Hirano in Hirano et al., 2019)

References

 Crosse, H. & Fischer, P., 1863. Note sur la faune malacologique de Cochinchine, comprenant la description des espèces nouvelles ou peu connues. Journal de Conchyliologie 11: 343-379
 Fischer-Piette, E., 1950. Listes des types décrits dans le Journal de Conchyliologie et conservés dans la collection de ce journal. Journal de Conchyliologie 90: 8-23

External links
 Fischer P. (1880-1887). Manuel de Conchyliologie et de Paléontologie Conchyliologique. Paris, Savy pp. XXIV + 1369 + pl. 23

Cyclophoridae
Gastropod genera